The Roman Catholic Archdiocese of Kupang is an archdiocese located in the city of Kupang, East Nusa Tenggara province in Indonesia.

History
 13 April 1967: Established as Diocese of Kupang from the Diocese of Atambua
 23 October 1989: Promoted as Metropolitan Archdiocese of Kupang

Leadership
 Archbishops of Kupang (Roman rite)
 Archbishop Peter Turang (10 October 1997 – present)
 Archbishop Gregorius Manteiro, S.V.D. (23 October 1989 – 10 October 1997)
 Bishops of Kupang (Roman Rite) 
 Bishop Gregorius Manteiro, S.V.D. (later Archbishop) (13 April 1967 – 23 October 1989)

Suffragan dioceses
 Atambua 
 Weetebula

Sources
 Official website
GCatholic.org
 Catholic Hierarchy

Kupang
Roman Catholic dioceses in Indonesia
Christian organizations established in 1967
East Nusa Tenggara
Roman Catholic dioceses and prelatures established in the 20th century